Deccan Charters is an aviation company based in Bengaluru, India that operates helicopter and fixed-wing charter services. Its main base is HAL Bangalore International Airport. Deccan Technical Services, the maintenance unit of Deccan Charters, maintains helicopters on behalf of 50 Indian corporates such as Reliance Industries and Essar Group.
Their Mumbai centre is the authorised customer service centre to support Sikorsky S-76 helicopters.
In March 2017, the firm bagged 21 regional air routes under the Indian Government's regional connectivity scheme, UDAN.

History

The airline started operations on 3 December 1997. as Deccan Aviation. It established Simplifly Deccan (formerly named Air Deccan), a low-cost airline in March 2003.
In July 2004, Deccan Aviation partnered with the Favourite Group of Sri Lanka to launch a helicopter charter company called Deccan Aviation Lanka. In early 2007, the company started fixed-wing charter operations. Deccan Charters exited from the company in November 2011, after selling their  48% stake to Singapore-based Millennium Aero which renamed the company as Millennium Airlines.

In February 2012, Deccan Charters partnered with Taj Air, Bjets and other partners under the Powerfly brand to provide an air charter membership program through which customers can access Jets, Turbo Props and Helicopters.
Deccan Charters Ltd. initiated non-scheduled chartered services in Gujarat under the brand name of Deccan Shuttles in August 2012. This service connected Ahmedabad, Surat, Jamnagar, Bhavnagar and Kandla. In April 2013, Deccan announced its decision to suspend all Gujarat operations citing poor patronage. In August 2014, Deccan Charters partnered  with Luan Airways for providing medical evacuation services in North-East India.

In April 2017, Deccan charters bid for and won 34 regional Indian routes under the UDAN scheme. Operating under the brand name Air Deccan, it will commence operations in December 2017 with flights between Mumbai and Nashik. Air Deccan will operate 19-seater Beechcraft 1900D turboprop aircraft that are suitable for short-haul flights. The airline has plans to connect Delhi, Mumbai, Kolkata and Shillong to regional towns in the vicinity of these cities.

Air Deccan
In March 2017, the firm was awarded 21 regional air routes under the Indian Government's regional connectivity scheme, UDAN. Deccan Charters decided to use the popular Air Deccan brand to launch these services that will connect emerging towns across Indian states of Meghalaya, Mizoram and Tripura at affordable prices.

Air Deccan received the scheduled commuter operator (SCO) permit from regulator Directorate General of Civil Aviation (DGCA) on 22 December 2017 and the first flight, DN 1320, took off for Jalgaon Airport, from the Chhatrapati Shivaji International Airport (CSIA) the following afternoon. In the first phase of operations, Air Deccan plans to connect to Jalgaon, Nashik and Kolhapur Airport from Mumbai and Pune Airport.

Fleet
The Deccan Charters fleet consists of the following fixed-wing aircraft and helicopters:

 Aérospatiale AS-355F Twin Ecureuil
 Beechcraft 1900D
 Bell 206 Jet Ranger
 Bell 206L-3 Long Ranger
 Bell 206L-4 Long Ranger
 Bell 212
 Bell 407
 Schweizer 330
2 Pilatus PC-12

Helitourism
Deccan Charters also provides tourism by helicopter.

Destinations
Andhra Pradesh
Puttaparthi (Helicopter)
Tirupati (Helicopter)

Delhi
Delhi

Gujarat
Surat (Offshore service-Helicopter)

Himachal Pradesh
Kullu
Manali (Helicopter)
Shimla (Helicopter)

Jammu and Kashmir
Amarnath (Helicopter)
Katra (Helicopter)
Vaishno Devi (Helicopter)

Jharkhand
Jamshedpur

Karnataka
Bangalore
Hampi (Helicopter)
Shravanabelagola (Helicopter)

Kerala
Cochin
Trivandrum
Guruvayur (Helicopter)
Thekkady (Helicopter)

Madhya Pradesh
Indore

Maharashtra
Mumbai (UDAN)
Jalgaon (UDAN)
Nashik (UDAN)
Pune (UDAN)
Kolhapur (UDAN)

Odisha
Bhubaneswar

Tamil Nadu
Chennai

Telangana
Hyderabad

Uttrakhand
 Badrinath (Helicopter)
 Kedarnath (Helicopter)

Uttar Pradesh
Agra (Helicopter)

West Bengal
Coochbehar
Kolkata

References

External links
 Deccan Aviation

Airlines of India
Airlines established in 1997
1997 establishments in Karnataka
Companies based in Bangalore
Indian companies established in 1997